Maria Mayerchyk (Ukrainian: Маєрчик Марія Степанівна, born 15 October 1971) is a Ukrainian feminist academic and the editor in chief of Feminist Critique: East European Journal of Feminist and Queer Studies.

She is noted for her analysis of feminism at the Euromaidan protests.

Education 
Mayerchyk attended the Ivan Franko National University of Lviv, from 1988 to 1993, from where she has a degree in journalism.

She has a PhD from the National Academy of Sciences of Ukraine that focused on ethnology.

Career 

Mayerchyk has been a fellow in research programs at the University of Greifswald (Germany), University of Alberta (Canada), Harvard University (USA), the University of South Florida (USA), Lund University (Sweden), Central European University (Hungary), and the Centre for Advanced Studies Sofia (Bulgaria).

She is a senior research scholar at the National Academy of Sciences of Ukraine's Institute of Ethnology in Lviv. Her academic interests include diaspora, feminism, folklore, sexuality, queer studies, and decolonial epistemologies of the European periphery.

Mayerchyk is the editor-in-chief of Feminist Critique: East European Journal of Feminist and Queer Studies.

She was the academic director of the OSI-HESP ReSET project "Gender, Sexuality, and Power" (2011-2014).

Publications 

 Maria Mayerchyk, Olga Plakhotnik. “‘Uneventful’ Feminist Protest in Post-Maidan Ukraine: Nation and Coloniality Revisited.” Postcolonial and Postsocialist Dialogues: Intersections, Opacities, Challenges in Feminist Theorizing and Practice, ed. by R. Koobak, M. Tlostanova, and S. Thapar-Björkert, 121–137. New York: Routledge (Advances in Feminist Studies and Intersectionality Series), 2021. DOI: https://doi.org/10.4324/9781003003199-11
 Maria Mayerchyk and Olga Plakhotnik. “Between Time of Nation and Feminist Time: Genealogies of Feminist Protest in Ukraine.” Feminist Circulations between East and West / Feministische Zirkulationen zwischen Ost und West, ed. by Annette Bühler-Dietrich, 25–46. Berlin: Frank & Timme, 2019.
 Maria Mayerchyk and Olga Plakhotnik, Radykalnyi Femen i novyi zhinochyi aktyvizm, (English: Radical "Femen" and new women's activism) Krytyka 11 (December 2010): 7–10
 Maria Mayerchyk and Olga Plakhotnik, Ukrainian Feminism at the Crossroad of National, Postcolonial, and (Post)Soviet: Theorizing the Maidan Events 2013–2014,” Krytyka (November 2015)
 Структурно-семантичний аналіз українських обрядів родинного циклу (English: Ritual and Body. The structural-semantic analysis of the Ukrainian familial-cycle rites) 2011
 Mayerchyk, Maria. "Doshliubni intymmni stosunky sered molodi v selakh ta mistakh Skhidnoi ta Tsentral'noi Ukrainy na pochatku XX Stolittia," Україна Модерна, 6 (2010): 101–112

See also

Relevant topics 
 Femen
 Women in Ukraine

Ukrainian feminist scholars 
 Vira Ageyeva
 Tamara Martsenyuk
 Irina Zherebkina

References

External links 

 List of publications
 Feminist Critique: East European Journal of Feminist and Queer Studies

1971 births
Living people
21st-century Ukrainian writers
21st-century Ukrainian women writers
Academic journal editors
National Academy of Sciences of Ukraine
People of the Revolution on Granite
Ukrainian academics
Ukrainian feminists
Ukrainian women academics
University of Lviv alumni